Delftse Studenten Basketball Vereniging Punch or simply Punch Delft is a Dutch amateur basketball team from the city of Delft. The team plays in the Promotiedivisie, the Dutch second division.

Punch was active as a professional team from 1960 till 1982 in the Dutch first division, the Dutch Basketball League. The team won the Dutch national championship in 1969 and 1975. The team won the NBB Cup in 1974.

Punch also played in European competitions in multiple seasons in its history, for example in the 1969–70 FIBA European Champions Cup. In the 1972–73 FIBA European Cup Winners' Cup it faced of against the elite Greek team Olympiacos.

Honours 

Dutch League
 Winners (2): 1968–69, 1974–75
Dutch Cup
 Winners (1): 1973–74

European record

(*) Match not played.

Notable players

 Toon van Helfteren
 Harry Rogers
 Jan Sikking

References

Punch
Punch
Punch